Cailey Hutchison is an American ice hockey forward, currently playing with the Connecticut Whale in the Premier Hockey Federation.

Career 

Across four years at the University of Maine, Hutchison scored 20 points in 127 games. 
She was drafted 21st overall by the Metropolitan Riveters in the 2018 NWHL Draft. After her graduation, she would sign her first professional contract with the team. In her first season, she scored 11 points in 24 games, serving as an assistant captain for the team. She was named to the 2020 NWHL All-Star Game as a replacement for Brooke Stacey.

During the 2021 off-season Hutchison, an unrestricted free agent, signed with the Connecticut Whale.

Personal life 

Her brother, Nick Hutchison has played for the Adirondack Thunder in the ECHL. She has a degree in nursing.

Career Statistics

External links

References 

1997 births
Living people
Metropolitan Riveters players
People from Hicksville, New York
Ice hockey players from New York (state)